The Beretta PMX is a 9x19mm Parabellum caliber submachine gun, designed and manufactured by the Italian company Beretta. The PMX was presented in 2017 and is intended to replace the Beretta M12 as an ordinance weapon of some law enforcement in Italy.

Development
The Beretta PMX was developed starting from the previous M12 model, already supplied to many police forces and armed forces around the world; starting from 2015–2016 there were many rumours about the release of the new submachine gun model that was then presented by Beretta during the "Milipol" exhibition in Paris in 2017.

Since 2018, Italy's Carabinieri has ordered, after experimentation in some operational departments, more than 5,000 PMXs with the future intention of modernizing the entire individual weapons arsenal. In March 2022 it was confirmed that the Saudi government awarded Beretta a contract for 3,500 PMXs to arm the Saudi Royal Guard Regiment.

Design details
The Beretta PMX is a closed bolt and blowback operated submachine gun made by engineering plastic and aluminum. Its total empty weight is 2.4 kg and it is 640 mm long with extended folding stock (418 mm with folded stock). It is fed with a 30-round magazine, chambered in 9×19mm Parabellum NATO caliber, shooting a 900 rounds/min rate of fire. It has an ambidextrous three-position manual safety with selective fire (semi-automatic and full auto), adjustable folding sights and "MIL-STD 1913" picatinny rails that allow to use various accessories as aiming devices of any type.

See also
 Beretta
 Beretta M12
 List of Italian submachine guns

References

External links
 Modern Firearms

Beretta firearms
9mm Parabellum submachine guns
Beretta submachine guns
Submachine guns of Italy